National Left may refer to:

National Left (Argentina), an Argentinian political party
The National Left (Israel), a left-wing Zionist movement in Israel
National Left (Australia), a faction of the Australian Labor Party
New National Left, a far-right political party in Spain